Kenar Gerd-e Pain (also Romanized as Kenār Gerd-e Pā’īn) is a village in Hasanabad Rural District, Fashapuyeh District, Ray County, Tehran Province, Iran. At the 2006 census, its population was 207, in 52 families.

References 

Populated places in Ray County, Iran